Lépanges-sur-Vologne (literally Lépanges on Vologne) is a commune in the Vosges department in Grand Est in northeastern France. It received considerable media attention during the Grégory Villemin murder case.

See also
Communes of the Vosges department

References

Communes of Vosges (department)